Cardamom, sometimes cardamon or cardamum, is a spice made from the seeds of several plants in the genera Elettaria and Amomum in the family Zingiberaceae. Both genera are native to the Indian subcontinent and Indonesia. They are recognized by their small seed pods: triangular in cross-section and spindle-shaped, with a thin, papery outer shell and small, black seeds; Elettaria pods are light green and smaller, while Amomum pods are larger and dark brown.

Species used for cardamom are native throughout tropical and subtropical Asia. The first references to cardamom are found in Sumer, and in the Ayurvedic literatures of India. Nowadays it is also cultivated in Guatemala, Malaysia, and Tanzania. The German coffee planter Oscar Majus Klöffer introduced Indian cardamom to cultivation in Guatemala before World War I; by 2000, that country had become the biggest producer and exporter of cardamom in the world, followed by India.

Etymology

The earliest attested form of the word  signifying "cress" is the Mycenaean Greek , written in Linear B syllabic script, in the list of flavourings on the "Spice" tablets found among palace archives in the House of the Sphinxes in Mycenae.

The modern genus name Elettaria is derived from the root  attested in Dravidian languages.

Types and distribution
The two main types of cardamom are:
 True or green cardamom (or when bleached, white cardamom) comes from the species Elettaria cardamomum and is distributed from India to Malaysia. What is often referred to as white cardamon is actually Siam cardamom, Amomum krervanh.
 Black cardamom, also known as brown, greater, large, longer, or Nepal cardamom, comes from species Amomum subulatum and is native to the eastern Himalayas and mostly cultivated in Eastern Nepal, Sikkim, and parts of Darjeeling district in West Bengal of India, and southern Bhutan.

He reports that some people believed they came from Media, others from India.

Uses
Both forms of cardamom are used as flavourings and cooking spices in both food and drink, and as a medicine. E. cardamomum (green cardamom) is used as a spice, a masticatory, or is smoked.

Food and beverage

Cardamom has a strong, unique taste, with an intensely aromatic, resinous fragrance. Black cardamom has a distinctly more smoky, though not bitter, aroma, with a coolness some consider similar to mint .

Green cardamom is one of the most expensive spices by weight, but little is needed to impart flavour. It is best stored in the pod, as exposed or ground seeds quickly lose their flavour. Grinding the pods and seeds together lowers both the quality and the price. For recipes requiring whole cardamom pods, a generally accepted equivalent is 10 pods equals  teaspoons of ground cardamom.

Cardamom is a common ingredient in Indian cooking. It is also often used in baking in the Nordic countries, in particular in Sweden, Norway, and Finland, where it is used in traditional treats such as the Scandinavian Yule bread , the Swedish  sweet bun, and Finnish sweet bread . In the Middle East, green cardamom powder is used as a spice for sweet dishes, as well as traditional flavouring in coffee and tea. Cardamom is used to a wide extent in savoury dishes.

In Asia, both types of cardamom are widely used in both sweet and savory dishes, particularly in the south. Both are frequent components in spice mixes, such as Indian and Nepali masalas and Thai curry pastes. Green cardamom is often used in traditional Indian sweets and in masala chai (spiced tea). Both are also often used as a garnish in basmati rice and other dishes. Individual seeds are sometimes chewed and used in much the same way as chewing gum. It is used by confectionery giant Wrigley; its Eclipse Breeze Exotic Mint packaging indicates the product contains "cardamom to neutralize the toughest breath odors". It is also included in aromatic bitters, gin, and herbal teas.

In Korea, Tavoy cardamom (Wurfbainia villosa var. xanthioides) and red cardamom (Lanxangia tsao-ko) are used in tea called .

Composition
The content of seed essential oil is dependent on storage conditions, and may be as high as 8%. In the oil are found α-terpineol 45%, myrcene 27%, limonene 8%, menthone 6%, β-phellandrene 3%, 1,8-cineol 2%, sabinene 2% and heptane 2%. Other sources report 1,8-cineol (20 to 50%), α-terpenylacetate (30%), sabinene, limonene (2 to 14%), and borneol.

In the seeds of round cardamom from Java (Wurfbainia compacta), the content of essential oil is lower (2 to 4%), and the oil contains mainly 1,8-cineol (up to 70%) plus β-pinene (16%); furthermore, α-pinene, α-terpineol and humulene are found.

World production

By the early 21st century, Guatemala became the largest producer of cardamom in the world, with an average annual yield between 25,000 and 29,000 tonnes. The plant was introduced there in 1914 by Oscar Majus Kloeffer, a German coffee planter. India, formerly the largest producer, since 2000 has been the second worldwide, generating around 15,000 tonnes annually.

Increased demand since the 1980s, principally from China, for both A. villosum and A. tsao-ko, has been met by farmers living at higher altitudes in localized areas of China, Laos, and Vietnam, people typically isolated from many other markets.

History 

The Babylonians and Assyrians recognized the health benefits of the spice early on, and trade in cardamom opened up along land routes and by the interlinked Persian Gulf route controlled from Dilmun as early as the third millennium BCE Early Bronze Age, into western Asia and the Mediterranean world.

The ancient Greeks thought highly of cardamom, and the Greek physicians Dioscorides and Hippocrates wrote about its therapeutic properties, identifying it as a digestive aid. Due to demand in ancient Greece and Rome, the cardamom trade developed into a handsome luxury business; cardamom was one of the spices eligible for import tax in Alexandria in 126 CE. In medieval times, Venice became the principal importer of cardamom into the west, along with pepper, cloves and cinnamon, which was traded with merchants from the Levant with salt and meat products.

In China, Amomum was an important part of the economy during the Song Dynasty (960–1279). In 1150, the Arab geographer Muhammad al-Idrisi noted that cardamom was being imported to Aden, in Yemen, from India and China.

Later, in the 16th century, the Portuguese became involved in the trade, when it conquered the west coast of India, but the industry did not become of major interest on a wider scale to Europeans until the 19th century.

Production practices 
According to Nair (2011), in the years when India achieves a good crop, it is still less productive than Guatemala. Other notable producers include Costa Rica, El Salvador, Honduras, Papua New Guinea, Sri Lanka, Tanzania, Thailand, and Vietnam.

Much production of cardamom in India is cultivated on private property or in areas which the government owns and leases out to farmers. Traditionally, small plots of land within the forests (called eld-kandies) where the wild or acclimatised plant existed are cleared during February and March. The brushwood is cut down and burned, and the roots of powerful weeds torn up so as to free the soil. Soon after clearing, cardamom plants spring up all over the prepared plots, and then, if left alone for a couple of years, by that time the cardamom plants may have eight to ten leaves and reach  in height. In the third year, they may be  in height. In the following May–June the ground is again weeded, and by September to November a light crop is obtained. The plants bear for three or four years, and historically the life of each plantation was about eight or nine years. The seasons in Malabar are a little later than in Mysore, and according to some reports, a full crop may even be obtained in the third year. It was also believed that above , the cardamoms grown are of a better quality than below that altitude.

Plants may be raised from seed or by division of the rhizome. The flowering season is April to May, and after swelling in August and September, by the first half of October usually attain the desired degree of ripening. The crop is accordingly gathered in October and November, and in exceptionally moist weather, the harvest protracts into December. At the time of harvesting, the scapes or shoots bearing the clusters of fruits are broken off close to the stems and placed in baskets lined with fresh leaves. The fruits are spread out on carefully prepared floors, sometimes covered with mats, and are then exposed to the sun. Four or five days of careful drying and bleaching in the sun is usually enough, but in rainy weather, artificial heat drying is necessary, though the fruits suffer very greatly in colour when this course is resorted to, and in consequence sometimes bleached with steam and sulphurous vapour or with ritha nuts.

The industry is highly labor-intensive, and each hectare requires a high degree of maintenance throughout the year. Production constraints mentioned are recurring climate vagaries, the absence of regular re-plantation, and ecological conditions associated with deforestation.

Cultivation 

In 1873 and 1874, Ceylon (now Sri Lanka) exported about  each year. In 1877, Ceylon exported , in 1879, and in the 1881–82 season,  In 1903,  of cardamom growing areas were owned by European planters. The volume for 1903–04 stated the value of the cardamoms exported to have been Rs. 3,37,000 as compared with Rs. 4,16,000 the previous year. India, which ranks second in world production, recorded a decline of 6.7 percent in cardamom production for 2012–13, and projected a production decline of 30–40% in 2013–14, compared with the previous year due to unfavorable weather. In India, the state of Kerala is by far the most productive producer, with the districts of Idukki, Palakkad and Wynad being the principal producing areas. Given that a number of bureaucrats have personal interests in the industry, in India, several organisations have been set up to protect cardamom producers such as the Cardamom Growers Association (est. 1992) and the Kerala Cardamom Growers Association (est. 1974). Research in India's cardamom plantations began in the 1970s while Kizhekethil Chandy held the office of Chairman of the Cardamom Board. The Kerala Land Reforms Act imposed restrictions on the size of certain agricultural holdings per household to the benefit of cardamom producers.

In 1979–1980, Guatemala surpassed India in worldwide production. Guatemala cultivates Elettaria cardamomum, which is native to the Malabar Coast of India. Alta Verapaz Department produces 70 percent of Guatemala's cardamom. Cardamom was introduced to Guatemala before World War I by the German coffee planter Oscar Majus Kloeffer. After World War II, production was increased to 13,000 to 14,000 tons annually.

In addition to Guatemala and India, Sri Lanka, Nepal, Papua New Guinea and Tanzania are also significant growers of cardamom. The average annual income for a plantation-owning household in 1998 was US$3,408. Although the typical harvest requires over 210 days of labor per year, most cardamom farmers are better off than many other agricultural workers, and there are a significant number of those from the upper strata of society involved in the cultivation process. Increased demand since the 1980s, principally from China, for both Wurfbainia villosa and Lanxangia tsao-ko, has provided a key source of income for poor farmers living at higher altitudes in localized areas of China, Laos, and Vietnam, people typically isolated from many other markets. Laos exports about 400 tonnes annually through Thailand according to the FAO.

Trade 
Cardamom production's demand and supply patterns of trade are influenced by price movements, nationally and internationally, in 5 to 6-year cycles. Importing leaders mentioned are Saudi Arabia and Kuwait, while other significant importers include Germany, Iran, Japan, Jordan, Pakistan, Qatar, United Arab Emirates, the UK, and the former USSR. According to the United Nations Conference on Trade and Development, 80 percent of cardamom's total consumption occurs in the Middle East.

In the 19th century, Bombay and Madras were among the principal distributing ports of cardamom. India's exports to foreign countries increased during the early 20th century, particularly to the United Kingdom, followed by Arabia, Aden, Germany, Turkey, Japan, Persia and Egypt. However, some 95% of cardamom produced in India is for domestic purposes, and India is itself by far the most important consuming country for cardamoms in the world. India also imports cardamom from Sri Lanka. In contrast, Guatemala's local consumption is negligible, which supports the exportation of most of the cardamom that is produced. In the mid-1800s, Ceylon's cardamom was chiefly imported by Canada. After saffron and vanilla, cardamom is currently the third most expensive spice, and is used as a spice and flavouring for food and liqueurs and in medicine.

Gallery

See also
 Aframomum corrorima, known as Ethiopian cardamom

References

Bibliography 

 
 
 
 
 
 
 
 CardamomHQ: In-depth information on Cardamom
 Mabberley, D.J. The Plant-book: A Portable Dictionary of the Higher Plants. Cambridge University Press, 1996, 
 Gernot Katzer's Spice Pages: Cardamom
 Plant Cultures: botany and history of Cardamom 
 Pham Hoang Ho 1993, Cay Co Vietnam [Plants of Vietnam: in Vietnamese], vols. I, II & III, Montreal.
 Buckingham, J.S. & Petheram, R.J. 2004, Cardamom cultivation and forest biodiversity in northwest Vietnam, Agricultural Research and Extension Network, Overseas Development Institute, London UK.
 Aubertine, C. 2004, Cardamom (Amomum spp.) in Lao PDR: the hazardous future of an agroforest system product, in 'Forest products, livelihoods and conservation: case studies of non-timber forest products systems vol. 1-Asia, Center for International Forestry Research. Bogor, Indonesia.

Plants used in Ayurveda
Plants used in traditional Chinese medicine
Alpinioideae
Spices
Medicinal plants of Asia
Arab cuisine
Bangladeshi cuisine
Bhutanese cuisine
Indonesian cuisine
Iranian cuisine
Iraqi cuisine
Pakistani spices
Nepalese cuisine
Plant common names
Sri Lankan spices
Indian spices
Aphrodisiac foods